

The Hinchman H-1 Racer is a 1980s American single-seat autogyro designed by Hank Hincham with plans or a kit available from Hincham Aircraft Company  for amateur construction.

By 1998 the kit and plans were being offered by Winners Circle Engineering Inc. of Monrovia, Indiana.

Design and development
The aircraft was designed to comply with the US Experimental - Amateur-built aircraft rules. It features a single main rotor, a single-seat enclosed cockpit with a windshield, tricycle landing gear with wheel pants, hydraulic disk brakes and a self-aligning nosewheel, plus a tail caster.

The aircraft fuselage structure is made from bolted-together aluminum tubing has a full aerodynamic, bullet-shaped, composite cockpit fairing that adds  to the aircraft's empty weight.

The manufacturer estimated the construction time from the supplied kit as 150 hours.

Operational history
By 1998 the company reported that 100 plans and kits had been sold and three aircraft were completed and flying.

In April 2015 one example was registered in the United States with the Federal Aviation Administration to the designer.

Specifications

See also

References

Notes

Bibliography

1980s United States civil utility aircraft
1980s United States sport aircraft
Homebuilt aircraft
Single-engined pusher autogyros
Aircraft first flown in 1987